The Royal Botanic Garden, Sydney is a heritage-listed major  botanical garden, event venue and public recreation area located at Farm Cove on the eastern fringe of the Sydney central business district, in the City of Sydney local government area of New South Wales, Australia.

Opened in 1816, the garden is the oldest scientific institution in Australia and one of the most important historic botanical institutions in the world. The overall structure and key elements  were designed by Charles Moore and Joseph Maiden, and various other elements designed and built under the supervision of Allan Cunningham, Richard Cunningham, and Carrick Chambers. The garden is owned by the Government of New South Wales and administered by the Royal Botanic Gardens and Domain Trust. The Botanic Garden, together with the adjacent Domain were added to the New South Wales State Heritage Register on 2 April 1999.

The Garden and The Domain are open every day of the year and access is free. Its stunning position on Sydney Harbour, the Sydney Opera House and the large public parklands of The Domain ensure it is one of the most visited attractions in Sydney. The garden is bordered by the Cahill Expressway to the south and west, Macquarie Street to the northwest, Art Gallery Road to the east, and Sydney Harbour to the north.

Establishment and development

The first farm by European settlers on the Australian continent, at Farm Cove, was established in 1788 by Governor Phillip. Although that farm failed, the land has been in constant cultivation since that time, as ways were found to make the relatively infertile soils more productive. The Botanic Garden was founded on this site by Governor Macquarie in 1816 as part of the Governor's Domain. Australia's long history of collection and study of plants began with the appointment of the first Colonial Botanist, Charles Fraser, in 1817. The Botanic Gardens is the oldest scientific institution in Australia and, from the earliest days, has played a major role in the acclimatisation of plants from other regions. After a succession of colonial botanists and superintendents, including the brothers Richard and Allan Cunningham, both also early explorers, John Carne Bidwill was appointed as the first Director in 1847. Charles Moore was possibly the most influential Director, with his responsibility spanning 48 years, from 1848 to 1896. Moore was succeeded by Joseph Maiden who added much to Moore's maturing landscape, and served for a period of 28 years.

The first one hundred years

Charles Fraser, Superintendent 1821–31, was the first botanist appointed to develop the gardens along scientific lines.  Fraser made many inland excursions particularly with John Oxley and brought back plants and specimens.  Fraser's plantings between 1827–8 from his Brisbane district and northern NSW travels survive, and include hoop pines (Araucaria cunninghamii), weeping lilly pillies (Waterhousia floribunda), a hoop (or Moreton Bay) pine (Araucaria cunninghamii), 2 swamp oaks (Casuarina cunninghamiana) on the eastern side of the palm grove.  On his death in 1831 he was succeeded by Richard Cunningham.  His brother, the explorer Allan Cunningham was also a director. A native red cedar Fraser collected in 1822 formerly thought to have been from the Parramatta region has been genetically tested and found to have been collected in the Dorrigo region. This tree grows still near the Palm House (beside Farm Cove Creek in Bed 9).

In 1825 Governor Brisbane directed that the Garden extend west of Farm Cove Creek, for an experimental garden, to acclimatise Australian plants for export and imported plants. Between 1829 and 1838 the wine growing industry of New South Wales began in the Garden with some vines being brought out with the First Fleet (1788), and a large supplementary collection of around 365 vine cultivars donated by James Busby in 1832 (planted early 1833). Busby in fact imported cuttings of over 540 vines, but all those of at least 170 of the accessions were either dead on arrival at Sydney or did not survive through to mid-1834. For three or four years, vines propagated from these plants were distributed throughout the colony, but the collection increasingly fell into neglect and was in a parlous state well before 1840, with very many vines dead and many of the remainder unidentifiable due to the loss of their labels and inadequate record keeping. In the 1830s the Lower Garden area at the head of Farm Cove was developed and the shoreline laid out in an ornamental fashion with serpentine paths.< In 1833 four gardens were recognised: the botanic garden (the lower garden at the head of the cove); the fruit garden; the experimental garden and the kitchen garden, still producing food for the Governor's table. Between 1837 and 1845 the (New) Government House was built in The Domain's north (north of the current extent of the Botanic Garden). In 1847 the fig tree avenue of Moreton Bay figs (Ficus macrophylla) was planted, lining main public entry to gardens from Macquarie Street eastward (now the line of the Cahill Expressway).

The East India Company windmill stood in The Domain near Government House stables. It was located close to the statue of a huntsman with dogs by Henri Henri Alfred Jacquemart, which is still in the grounds of the Royal Botanical Garden. Built of stone, it was owned by the Government and was used for grinding the grain of the settlers. According to Freeman’s Journal, the windmill was built by the East India Company who were granted land around Farm Cove. The Governor of New South Wales later took forcible possession of the mill which resulted in a drawn-out lawsuit between the company and the government. During the dispute the Collector of Internal Revenue, Mr Wm. McPherson hired a manager to live in the cottages next to the mill. At this time, where the Bent-street entrance is was occupied as a large dairy, kept by Mr W. Stone. There was a large gate near the dairy; it stood a bit in from Bent-street, and faced Macquarie-street, with two large Norfolk Island pines on either side. This was the entrance to the company’s mill, but it could not be called a public entrance in the accepted meaning, it being on private property. Finally, in 1835 Sir Richard Bourke had the mill taken down and removed.

In 1848 John Carne Bidwill was appointed (the first such title) Director, by Governor Fitzroy. Meantime in England horticulturist Charles Moore (1820–1905) was appointed Director by the English Government. Bidwell was succeeded the following year by Moore. Bidwill was offered the post of Commissioner of Lands, Wide Bay. Moore was a Scotsman who had trained in the Botanic Gardens of Trinity College, Dublin. Moore remained Director for 48 years (1848–96) and did much to develop the Botanic Gardens in their modern form. He boldly tackled the problems of poor soil, inadequate water and shortage of funds to develop much of the Gardens as we see them today. The Palm Grove at the heart of the Garden is a reminder of his skill and foresight, as is the reclaimed land behind the Farm Cove seawall which significantly expanded the area of the Garden. Moore renovated paths throughout the upper gardens, built new paths in lower garden and added  were added to the lower gardens between 1848 and 1858. Between 1848 and 1879 Moore organised construction of the sea wall and reclamation of Farm Cove's tidal flats (work proceeded in two stages) to expand the Lower Garden, the wall being built of stone recycled from demolished Old Government House in Bridge Street, and a long walk was established along Farm Cove.  Ornamental ponds in the lower garden were laid out using Farm Cove creek, water supply for upper gardens was aided by water pipe installed from Macquarie Street.

Other work completed under Moore's extensive tenure included:
1850svista pavilions added in gardens, one with a thatched roof;
1852the Sydney-based herbarium collection started;
1857a small portion of the Governor's kitchen garden (Upper Garden) was converted as part of the Botanic Garden;
1860an aviary opened (site of current succulent/cacti garden) after public lobbying;
1860the original grape vines were uprooted;
1862the Palm grove was established near the Middle Garden, summer houses built in gardens. A zoo was added to aviary area. The zoo was Sydney's first and operated in the Gardens from 1862 until 1883, when most of it was transferred to Moore Park. During these years much of the remnant natural vegetation of the surrounding Domain was removed and planted as parkland. The Moreton Bay Figs, one of the major elements of this planting, continue to dominate the landscape. In the same year there was considerable plantings of NSW/Queensland rainforest tree species, and palms;
1863cottage built near Governor's Bathing house for Government House gardener;
The Domain gate lodge and gates built, (Hospital Road, Prince Albert Road), Victoria Lodge gate house and gates was built (first stage) at east of Gardens near Mrs Macquarie's Point
Late 1860smain part of Governor's kitchen garden (Upper garden) given up as an addition to the Upper Garden;
1870Governor's private gates built (now Opera House gates);
1870sdemolished the convict barracks built in Cunningham's time, and old glasshouses in former Governor's kitchen garden to make open grassed areas of Upper Garden;
1871 of the former Governor's kitchen garden was converted to Botanic Gardens, used as a nursery and propagating ground;
1873main entry gates built, off Fig Tree Avenue (east of Bent Street, now Cahill Expressway);
1874Italianate style two-storey Superintendent/Director's residence (now the Cunningham building) with tower was built, near Woolloomooloo gates);  
1876Palm house glasshouse built in Middle Garden; and
1878single storey herbarium and overseer's residence built.

The Garden Exhibition Palace was built on land between the Government House stables (now the Conservatorium of Music) and Governor Bourke's statue, an area until then used for grazing. The Palace was built to a design by Government Architect James Barnet for the first Australian International Exhibition. It was the epitome of the High Victorian style, complemented by the surroundings new gardens. However, the building was destroyed by fire in 1882. After the clean up  of new gardens were added to the RBG "Palace Garden"). Joseph Maiden moved and displayed the remnants of the exhibition fire to a pavilion in The Domain which became the official museum, incorporating a herbarium.

In 1880 a monkey house was built as part of the zoo. The same year, Tarpeian Way, including a stone stairway of 53 steps, was cut out of the rocky escarpment north of Bennelong Point, forming a south east boundary to the gardens. From The Sydney Morning Herald, 4 October 1880:

Scottish gardener Alexander Grant was born in 1845 at Cullen, Scotland and served an apprenticeship in the gardens of Cullen House in Banffshire. Before migrating to Australia in 1878 he followed his profession in several Scottish gardens, including the Botanic Gardens in Edinburgh. Grant arrived in the colony in 1878 and worked first at Yaralla, Concord for the Walkers for some considerable time, then at Rosemont, Woollahra for Alexander Campbell MLC, then for Mr Tooth at the Swifts, which he planned and laid out. There is no record of where Grant was living while working at Yaralla and Rosemont, though from 1881 he lived at Willow Cottage in Point Piper Road – west side (later Ocean Street), Paddington until he moved to quarters in the Botanic Garden, Sydney in 1882 for work there. It is likely that the positions at Yaralla and Rosemont both included quarters for a single man and that only after he married Margaret Stevenson in January 1880 was he obliged to find alternative accommodation (Willow Cottage).

Towards the end of his time as Director, Moore, together with Ernst Betche, published the Handbook of the Flora of New South Wales, further establishing the Botanic Garden as a centre for the science of botany.

From 1882 on Director Joseph Maiden added lighting (e.g.: on the sea walk on Farm Cove), seating, lavatories, drinking fountains and pathways. During the 1880s the Tarpeian Rock was a prominent, dramatic and significant sandstone cliff landscape feature on the north west boundary of the Domain facing Bennelong Point and the Sydney Opera House, cut for the extension of Macquarie Street. The Rock derives its name from the famous Tarpeian Rock on the Capitoline Hill in Rome from where prisoners were hurled to their deaths in ancient times. A stairway gives access from close to the Sydney Opera House to the top of the rock and The Domain. The carving reads "The Tarpeian Way." It possibly dates from the time of construction in the 1880s.

Between 1896 and 1901 Director Maiden installed new lighting, seating, lavatories, fountains and pathways.  Lighting along the sea walk and the lower garden installed, making the ring of water front of the lower gardens complete. In 1897 the Governor Phillip fountain was built near Macquarie Street/Garden palace gates. In 1899 a new herbarium building (second storey added by Govt. Architect Vernon to existing building, ground floor adapted as lecture hall and library, museum and admin centre) was built; now the Anderson Building.

Developments in the twentieth century

Moore was succeeded by Joseph Henry Maiden who, during his 28-year term, added much to Moore's maturing landscape. He organised the construction of a new herbarium building, opened in 1901 (today part of the Anderson Building), and made major improvements to The Domain. However, the Botanic Garden suffered from loss of staff positions during the World War I, and in the Great Depression of the 1930s, the position of Director was lost. Both the Herbarium and the living collections languished.

In 1901 Maiden had an obelisk erected in a central pond, housing the relocated remains of Allan Cunningham from the Devonshire Street Cemetery. Maiden also drained and sewered the gardens. Between 1908 and 1916 the Sydney Conservatorium of Music was created by adapting the former Governor's Stables in the Western Domain. In 1912 the Palm House new superstructure was completed, designed by Government Architect George McRae. In 1926 the Spring walk was replanted.

In 1936, on the site of the former aviaries/zoo, in the eastern section of the Garden, a succulent garden was created, near the Herbarium. In 1938 the Pioneer Memorial Women's' Garden opened, laid out in sunken circular area under the centre of the former (1879–82) Garden Palace dome. Laid out by Andersons & Co. of Sydney. In 1940 the aviary was removed.

From 1958 until the 1960s the Cahill Expressway was extended, bisecting The Domain and the Botanic Garden, partly destroying Fig Tree Avenue (first entrance, planted 1847) and loss of 24 palm trees and 12 other trees lost.  A new Garden entrance was made on Macquarie Street with pools and prostrate plants, and recycled sandstone and iron gates from the post-Garden Palace fire.  This entrance leads to the Palace Gardens. The Botanic Garden and The Domain were sewered for the first time since 1792. From 1945 Robert Anderson worked to reunify the Herbarium and Botanic Garden. In 1959 the title 'Royal' was granted, following the landing of Queen Elizabeth II in Farm Cove, this being the first site in Australia on which a reigning monarch had stood.

As Director, Knowles Mair (1965–70) achieved reunification and the Royal Botanic Garden began its return to eminence. In 1968 the Herbarium was combined with the Royal Botanic Garden. From 1969 further reconstruction and planting after completion of Cahill Expressway and The Domain Parking station. Australian and New Zealand native plants were extensively used, in the plantings near the Bent Street/Macquarie Street entrance (opposite the State Library) and Woolloomooloo gates near Mrs Macquarie's Road. Many glasshouses were removed in the 1970s under Director Mair, and the new Pyramid Glasshouse, built in 1970–71, designed by Anchor, Mortlock & Murray.  The first of its kind in the world, it contained a spiral staircase to allow visitors to observe all levels of tropical plant growth within.

In 1972–85 Dr Lawrence Johnson, Director, proposed the "thematic" planting scheme in evidence today.  NSW and Queensland rainforest trees collected by Fraser, the Allan and Richard Cunningham, and Charles Moore scattered throughout the Garden were supplemented by a new section of tropical and subtropical rainforest flora near the Pyramid glasshouse.  The palm collection, which is planted in three separate groves in the Garden, was thinned of duplicate species, particularly in Moore's original palm grove, and new species were added. The fig (Ficus) collection, mainly in the lower garden, was rationalised and centred on the slope below Government House, with many additional species added. A garden bed of local native species was added near the Cunningham building in the Upper garden, and the long bed of native small trees and shrubs along the boundary of the gardens on Macquarie Street was thickened with new plantings. A collection of eucalypts on the lawns of the Lower Garden north of the Macquarie Wall was under planted with a new collection of cycads, many relocated from the original Moore Palm Grove. A Myrtales bed near the Twin ponds in the Lower Garden was added.

Directors, Dr John Beard (1970–72) and Dr Lawrence Johnson (1972–85) further developed the organisation. The breadth of activities increased over these decades with the formation of the Friends of the Royal Botanic Garden; educational and ecological programs; the Flora of New South Wales; the scientific journals Telopea and Cunninghamia and programs of computerised documentation of both the living and herbarium collections.

Between 1970 and 1980 the new succulent and cacti garden was built on the site of the former aviary/zoo near Mrs Macquarie's Road in the east. In 1978 the administration of the Botanic Garden and National Herbarium of NSW were transferred from the Department of Agriculture (where they had been administered since 1908) to the Premier's Department. In 1972, a carpark for the Sydney Opera House was not built after the Builders Labourers Federation placed a green ban on the site.

Also in 1980 Centennial Park, which until then had been administered by staff of the Botanic Gardens since Moore's directorship, became autonomous under its own Trust.

In 1982 the new Herbarium building was built under Director Johnson opened (named the Brown building in honour of colonial botanist Robert Brown), linking the former Herbarium (now called the Maiden Theatre and Moore Room) building and the 1870s former Superintendent/Director's residence. The former Herbarium was adapted to a visitors' centre, shop and exhibitions space (now the Moore Room, within the then renamed R. H. Anderson Building), and the former Director's residence, named now the Cunningham building, was adapted for office use by staff. The complex was opened on 6 November 1982 by then Premier Neville Wran, QC MP. The Brown building had three levels housing the herbarium collection in 55,000 specially-designed red plastic boxes, plus scientific staff offices, a laboratory, scanning electron microscope and full drying room and library. In July 1982 a general meeting established the Friends of the Botanic Gardens and members' events (to raise funds for the Botanic Garden) commenced in December 1982.

In 1987 and 1988 under Director Carrick Chambers, two satellite botanic gardens areas were opened, Mt. Annan (subsequently renamed the Australian Botanic Garden Mount Annan on Narellan Road near Campbelltown featuring native plants, and Mount Tomah (subsequently renamed the Blue Mountains Botanic Garden on the Bells Line of Road in the northern Blue Mountains, featuring cool-climate plants. Both were formally opened in 1988 as part of Australia's Bicentennial celebrations. During 1988 and 1989 a new rose garden was built near the Bridge Street gates (since removed).  A new curved "Arc" glasshouse was built adjoining (east of) the Pyramid glasshouse, which was intended for ferns.  It has since been adapted for tropical plants. In 2015 the Pyramid was demolished to make way for "Calyx" the new display and tropical plant centre. The curved "Arc" glasshouse is being adapted as part of the same works. The Royal Botanic Gardens celebrated its 175th anniversary in 1991. During Professor Chambers' ten years as Director, the Rose Garden (1988), the Fernery (1993), the Herb Garden (1994), and the Oriental Garden (1997) were opened and the Rare and Threatened Species Garden (1998) was commenced to further enrich the experience of visitors. The Royal Botanic Garden Foundation was established to seek a wider range of support for future needs.

During the 1990s Asian themed plants garden added in Lower Garden below kiosk and east of Twin ponds.  A new fernery designed by John Barbeceto was built in the Middle Gardens (on the site of two former shade houses) adjoining the gardens nursery area and palm grove.  A new herb garden was built in the western side of the Lower gardens below the Conservatorium.  Considerable upgrade works were undertaken in the run up to the 2000 Sydney Olympic Games, including adaptation of existing buildings for new central shop and toilets. The Cadi Jam Ora – First Fleet Encounters garden was  created north of the Palm House in the Middle Garden area. John Lennis (1952–2015) as Aboriginal Education Officer was responsible for the content, "flavour" and involvement of Aboriginal people in this garden. During 1992 and 19933 the Palm House glasshouse was reconstructed to its 1912 form and adapted to become an exhibition space.  About 50% of its original glazing was recycled on the south side, also s patterned glass was reused. In the mid-1990s a fourth level was added to the Robert Brown building (National Herbarium), providing more work spaces and shelving for 20,000 more red herbarium boxes and a sloping roof to stop leaks.

From 1996–8 the Rare & Endangered Garden, was laid out north of the Herbarium, growing and displaying plants under threat in the wild or out-of-fashion in cultivation. Jeremy Coleby-Williams was instrumental in establishing this. Also in 1997–8 the HSBS Oriental Garden was established west of the lotus pond in the middle garden. Its site has Asian associations dating from 1917. In 1998 the Wollemi pine (Wollemia nobilis) was discovered in a remote gorge in Wollemi National Park by Phillip Noble, triggering an innovative propagation campaign to secure this species in ex-situ cultivation. An early specimen was planted on the site of the main intersection of paths between the middle garden, Cadi Jam Ora – First Encounters and the Rare and Endangered Gardens.

Developments in the twenty-first century
In 2000 the toilet block in the Palm Grove was adapted and extended to become the Garden Shop, renamed the Palm Grove Centre. During 2000 to 2001 the Conservatorium of Music was redeveloped with new underground extensions, demolition of trial grass beds and incorporation of new roof garden areas to gardens over the new Conservatorium.  A new land bridge was built (completed in 2005) over the Cahill Expressway/Eastern Distributor redevelopment, linking the Art Gallery of NSW, Mrs Macquarie's Road, The Domain and Botanic Garden, with small additional land area and new native plantings to The Domain. In 2003 a Fig tree avenue (Cahill Expressway median) was removed. Originally it was planted in 1847 in the brief directorship of John Carne Bidwill). The rose garden was also removed for redevelopment, the Spring Walk plantings (azaleas, etc.) were removed for fumigation/fallowing of soil.

In 2005 the fourth on-site Rose Garden near the Conservatorium and its adjoining pergolas were altered with additions made to both to allow functions, set up and preparation facilities, and a new amenities block. From 2006 the Cacti and Succulent Garden was partially revamped by Jamie Durie, celebrity horticulturist. The Central Gardens Depot was also redeveloped, with repair of significant heritage glasshouses, new glasshouses, store and staff areas.

From 2011 onwards the relocation of a growing colony of roosting grey-headed flying foxes (bats) in the Palm Grove has resulted in slow renewal of that area. The roosting activities of the bats had caused the death of a number of highly significant trees and previous attempts using noise, sprinklers and lights had proved ineffective in encouraging the animals to move. In Autumn 2014 Palm Grove was restored, with over 1300 palm species being donated by Illawarra businessman and conservationist Colin Wilson, after he saw the damage flying foxes (bats) had caused. Efforts to grow this collection will help secure the survival of many very rare species. The Palm Grove was once internationally recognised as one of the best in the world. The goal was to restore it to equal or surpass its past glory and give an opportunity to see a wide range of palms. At their peak some 22,000 grey-headed flying foxes roosted in the Palm Grove and Gardens. The former was their favoured spot. They killed 28 mature trees, 30 palms and many understorey plants. The Royal Botanic Gardens and Domain Trust commenced a successful flying-fox relocation programme in 2012.

In July 2015 the Minister announced organisational changes to transform the Royal Botanic Gardens and Domain Trust into a more efficient and responsive organisation. He revealed the name of the new Biome project will be "The Calyx", which opened in 2016. He also announced a 26% increase in agency budget over 2014–15 estimates.

In 2016 the Royal Botanic Garden celebrated its 200 years anniversary with various events to commemorate key educational, horticultural, scientific and cultural experiences of those two centuries. Fireworks displays ushering in the New Year, significant new exhibitions and collaborations with other cultural institutions.

Royal Botanic Gardens and Domain Trust

The Garden comes under the responsibility of the Royal Botanic Gardens and Domain Trust, established in 1980 by act of the New South Wales Parliament. The Domain Leasing Act 1961 was repealed and An Act to constitute the Royal Botanic Gardens and Domain Trust was passed, defining its powers, authorities, duties and functions. The trust is also responsible for the adjoining public open space of The Domain as well as the Australian Botanic Garden Mount Annan in western Sydney and the Blue Mountains Botanic Garden Mount Tomah in the Blue Mountains. While the Trustees provide oversight of the lands under legislative guidelines, the day-to-day operational management of the Garden is undertaken by staff. In 2014 it was announced that the Royal Botanic Gardens and Domain Trust would be known as the Botanic Gardens & Centennial Parklands, widening responsibilities to take in the heritage-listed Centennial Parklands that includes Centennial, Moore and Queens parks.

Description 
The Garden forms a large natural amphitheatre, wrapped around and sloping down towards the 'stage' of Farm Cove. It is divided into four major precincts called the Lower Gardens, the Middle Gardens, the Palace Gardens and the Bennelong precinct. Within the four major precincts are many smaller gardens and features as well as large amounts of lightly wooded lawn areas. Located approximately in the middle of the four precincts is the Palm Grove Centre which offers a restaurant, cafe, visitors centre and bookshop. A large and complex public botanic garden, largely of late 19th-century character; being not only an historic site of the first importance but containing within it numerous structures which have been nominated separately by the National Trust of Australia (NSW). A predominantly nineteenth century character of landscape layout strengthened by large mature trees. Traditionally designated as four areas reflecting its development.

The single most distinct landscape feature in the Garden is the historic hand-hewn sandstone seawall that curves around Farm Cove from Mrs Macquarie's Point to the Opera House, delineating the garden from the harbour and providing a focal point for visitors, joggers and photographers.

The layout of the Gardens is exceptionally important, each area (the Middle garden, the Lower Garden, the Palace Lawn etc.) reflects an important stage in the development of the Garden and the current fashion in landscape design almost from the founding of the colony.  The squared beds of the Middle Garden are traditionally believed to reflect the first furrows and shortly thereafter the first garden plots of the new settlement. The old Garden Palace grounds is the area bordering Macquarie Street and the Conservatorium of Music (former Government House stables).  The Middle Garden is the first farm site.  The Upper garden comprises the southern section housing administrative offices and National Herbarium on Mrs Macquarie's road as well as the nursery and depot area bordering the Cahill Expressway.  The Lower Garden comprises the rest of the area extending north of the Middle Garden to Farm Cove.

The Garden Palace grounds being the highest point have excellent views and are maintained as lawn areas, garden beds, Australian shrubs and turf species.  The area was originally enclosed by a paling fence for grazing the Governor's stock.  An ornamental fence was constructed along Macquarie Street and in the grounds stood the Garden Palace built 1879 which was destroyed by fire in 1882.

The Middle Garden is now the most closely cultivated section of the gardens where both native and exotic species are well labelled.  It included the spring walk famous for its azalea display, one of the finest collections of outdoor palms in the world and a 1970s succulent garden. Some of the Lower Garden was laid out by Charles Fraser and features ponds which are frequented by waterfowl including Australian Black Swans which breed successfully in the environment.

Lower Gardens
Charles Moore directed the reclamation of and expansion of the "Lower Garden" into Farm Cove, extending the gardens' pleasure grounds with curving pleasure walks, tree and shrubbery plantings. This work took place over 30 years, resulting in a gardenesque parkland which retains much of its original layout and composition today. Within this layout there are collections of plants of note, including from the Canary Islands, New Zealand and the Pacific Islands. The lower gardens feature the Band Lawn, the main Ponds, the HSBC Oriental Garden, the Yurong, Victoria Lodge, Henry Lawson Gates and the Maiden Pavilion.

Middle Gardens
The long rectangular beds have evolved from the rectangular beds of the earliest garden.  The land before the first Government House and Bennelong Point was laid out in the manner of an English park, the Botanic Garden was treated in a purely functional way.  The gate in the wall which Macquarie had completed in 1816 to protect the garden from the harbour, and which now separates the Middle and Lower Gardens. Fraser's plantings in what is now called the "Palm Grove", made between 1827–8 from his Brisbane district and northern NSW travels survive, and include hoop pines (Araucaria cunninghamii), weeping lilly pillies (Waterhousia floribunda), a hoop pine (Araucaria cunninghamii), two swamp oaks (Casuarina cunninghamiana) on the eastern side of the palm grove.  On his death in 1831 he was succeeded by Richard Cunningham.  His brother, the explorer Allan Cunningham, was also a director. A native red cedar Fraser collected in 1822 formerly thought to have been from the Parramatta region has been genetically tested and found to have been collected in the Dorrigo region. This tree grows still near the Palm House (beside Farm Cove Creek in Bed 9).

Charles Moore planted the Palm Grove which has an internationally significant collection of palms and rainforest species in the Middle Garden. 
The middle gardens feature the Palm House, the Wollemi Pine, the Succulent Garden, the Rare and Threatened Plant Garden, the Herbarium & Plant Sciences Building, the Lion Gate Lodge, the Begonia Garden and the Macquarie Wall and Spring Walk.

Palace Gardens
The Palace Gardens feature the Calyx, the Rainforest Walk, the Pioneer Garden, the Morshead Fountain Gate, the Palace Garden Gate, the Rose Garden & Pavilion, the Turf Plots, the Old Mill Garden, the Herb Garden and the Sydney Conservatorium of Music.

Bennelong Precinct
The Bennelong Precinct contains Government House, the Parade Ground, the Australian Native Rockery, Bennelong Lawn and the Queen Elizabeth II Gate.

Palm Grove Centre
The Palm Grove Centre features the Palm Grove itself, a Cafe, Garden Shop and the Botanic Gardens Restaurant.

Daniel Solander Library
The library at the Royal Botanic Gardens was established in 1852. It is named after Daniel Solander (1733–1782) who was a student of Linnaeus and held positions at the British Museum, including working in the library. He was employed in 1768 by Joseph Banks to accompany him on HMS Endeavour on James Cook's first voyage to the Pacific. On their return to England in 1771 he became Banks' botanist and librarian.

The library is the oldest botanical research library in Australia. The library has a collection of horticultural, botanic and taxonomic literature and is located within the National Herbarium of New South Wales which has samples collected by Banks and Solander on the voyage with James Cook amongst more than 1.2 million plant specimens.

Flying foxes

The Royal Botanic Garden was for decades home to a large colony of native Grey-headed Flying Foxes, a large species of fruit bat. The colony (estimated to be over 20,000 strong at times) caused significant damage to the trees used for roosting, especially around the Palm Grove Centre where dozens of historic trees were killed or severely damaged.

In May 2010 the trust announced a plan to evict the colony from the gardens by driving them away with repeated playing of extremely loud recorded noise. This plan was subsequently held up for several years by court action instigated by an animal welfare group but approval was finally given to the trust to proceed in June 2012. By June 2013 the bats had entirely left the Garden and the damaged trees had started to recover.

In an ironic coda, many of the bats displaced from the garden were found to have moved to a native bushland site on the north coast of New South Wales which was scheduled to be destroyed for an upgrade of the Pacific Highway, the main road linking Sydney with Brisbane. The destruction of the forest and displacement of that colony became a publicly contentious environment-versus-development issue in early 2014 and the building of the road was delayed pending a court-ordered federal government environmental assessment.

Heritage listing 
As at 22 September 1998, the Royal Botanic Garden and The Domain collectively are of exceptional national, state and local significance as:

General values 
 It is one of the earliest surviving colonial botanic gardens in the world and one of the oldest, richest and most extensive early public cultural landscapes in Australia with a substantially intact area and major precincts that are nationally rare from a historic, scientific, aesthetic and social perspective, and which continue to fulfil diverse use expectations by remaining freely accessible and in high demand from a broad community spectrum;
 As it contains three of the most important collections for botanical science in Australia notable for their rarity, diversity, size and scientific value – its living collection which is distinguished by many rare and unusual cultivated plants, the extensive preserved collections of the Herbarium and comprehensive botanical library (scientific/technical and research values);
Additionally The Domain is of historical and aesthetic value on a national level for its ability to demonstrate its dual role as the prime example of a pleasure ground attached to Government House and as a leading example of a public park developed from the mid 19th century as an early designated landscape for public use (1831) the site was at the forefront of international concerns for the integration of public parks within city planning and development.

Primary values 
 As an important and integral part of the boundaries – from 1792 – of the first permanent European settlement in Australia.  It is also an integral part of a large group of early Australian colonial sites located along, and linked by, Macquarie Street, including the largest surviving group of Governor Macquarie-era places in Australia.  Individually and collectively these sites have considerable potential to reveal much about the formative town planning, settlement and development pattern of the City of Sydney (historic and technical/research values);
 It contains one of the earliest established botanic gardens in the southern hemisphere (1816); the whole site comprises a broad and idiosyncratic collection of native and exotic plants (8000 taxa and 45,000 accessions) acquired over a period of 190 years for the purpose of scientific study including research for agriculture, ornamental horticulture and industry (scientific/technical/research and historic values);
 It contains three of the most valuable assets to botanical science in Australia – its living collection which is distinguished by many rare and unusual cultivated plants, the preserved collections of the herbarium and the RBG library archives (scientific/technical/research and historic values);
 It continues, uninterrupted, a close and direct link with the study, classification and cultivation of the indigenous vegetation of NSW from the time of Charles Fraser (1817) and remaining a core function of the institution and landscape (scientific/technical/research and historic values);
 The place has strong and direct associations with many notable early botanical explorers and collectors such as William Paterson, John Carne Bidwill, Ludwig Leichhardt and John Richardson; and with their important plant acquisitions still extant in the living and preserved collections (scientific/technical/research and historic values);
 It has strong and direct associations with various prominent early directors such as Charles Fraser, Richard and Allan Cunningham, Charles Moore and Joseph Maiden – who were largely responsible for the present overall form of the landscape as well as the content and organisation of the plant collections (scientific/technical/research and historic values);
 It has strong and direct associations with many distinguished 20th century scientists – such as Dr Darnell-Smith, Knowles Mair, Robert Anderson and Dr Lawrence Johnson – whose research, using the living and preserved collections of the place and building on the work of the 19th century RBG botanists, forms the basis of contemporary knowledge and understanding of Australian plants.  The collections remain an important basis for contemporary research in systematic and horticultural botany and plant ecology by various Australian and international scientists (scientific/technical/research and historic values);
 It is closely associated with the history and development of the principal government residences – as well as the Governors – of New South Wales; and it remains an integral part of the historical and visual landscape of Government House and of the archaeological remains of the First Government House (scientific/technical/research and historic values);
 It is a nationally important representative example of a largely intact high-Victorian/Edwardian subtropical Gardenesque landscape design – retaining elements of the earlier Macquarie-era "estate park" – with the capacity to indicate evolving landscape design styles in Australia over the past 200 years (historic & aesthetic values);
 It retains many important components of the various phases of its layout – including paths, fences, bedding areas, plantations, views, monuments, statuary, fountains, walling, steps, other landscape furnishings and gate houses – that give the landscape its distinctive visual and botanical character (historic, aesthetic & technical/research values);
 Both the overall place as well as particular areas within it are highly valued by the community – for strong personal associations and memories, and for providing a sense of identity and continuity of use.  The place has been, and continues to be, the focus of important historic events in the cultural and political life of New South Wales (social & historic values); 
 It fulfils an important role as a part of the quintessential setting for nearby architectural landmarks such as the Sydney Opera House, St. Mary's Cathedral and Aurora Place – all having, individually, exceptional aesthetic value.  The Tarpeian Rock is a prominent, dramatic and significant sandstone cliff landscape feature of the Domain facing Bennelong Point and the Sydney Opera House, cut for the extension of Macquarie Street and an example of 19th century romanticism (aesthetic value);
 It is an integral part of Sydney's scenic harbour landscape (aesthetic value);
 It remains a potent source of inspiration for artists and writers since the inception of the colony; and as a setting for public art (historic, aesthetic & social values);
 Despite various interventions over the last 200 years it is still possible to appreciate the basic form of the pre-European landscape – the two ridged promontories enclosing the central gully (aesthetic value); 
 The place demonstrates changing fashions in horticulture, garden design and ornament, and the practice of botany through its landscape and architectural design and art as it has continued to be developed, reshaped and embellished by successive directors and overseers (historic & aesthetic values);
 The trialling of various plant species – for example Canary Island date palms (Phoenix canariensis), brush box (Lophostemon confertus) and Hill's fig (Ficus microcarpa var. Hillii) – within the place has subsequently influenced their popularity and use throughout Sydney and beyond (scientific/technical/research and aesthetic values); 
 As a landscape it has also been the setting for earlier important structures such as the Exhibition Palace, Fort Macquarie, the Crimean War period fortifications, the temporary Federation pavilion and for which some archaeological evidence may remain (scientific/technical/research values); and
 From an early date the place developed, and continues to develop, a didactic role of increasing knowledge and understanding about plants through displays, public lectures, tours and social events based on the living collections and the landscape setting (social value).

National, state and local significance
The Royal Botanic Garden, Sydney, is of exceptional national, state and local significance as one of the earliest surviving colonial botanic gardens in the world and one of the richest and most extensive early public cultural landscapes in Australia with substantially intact major precincts that are nationally rare from a historic, scientific, aesthetic and social perspective.

The Royal Botanic Garden, Sydney has scientific significance
 as it comprises an eclectic collection of native and exotic plants acquired over almost two centuries, for the purpose of scientific study including research for agriculture, ornamental horticulture and industry (scientific/technical/research and historic values);
 for the extraordinary breadth of the living collections for botanical science in Australia – its living collection which is distinguished by many rare and unusual cultivated plants, the extensive preserved collections of the Herbarium and comprehensive botanical library (scientific/technical/research values);
 as it contains three of the most important collections for botanical science in Australia – its living collection which is distinguished by many rare and unusual cultivated plants, the extensive preserved collections of the Herbarium and comprehensive botanical library (scientific/technical and research values);
 for the long-standing close and direct link with the study, classification and cultivation of the indigenous plants of NSW, Australia and the South Pacific region, which remains a core function of the scientific institution and the Garden (scientific/technical and research values);
 for the archaeological potential and remains of former Aboriginal and European occupation on the site.  The Garden are part of the clan territory, or country of the Gadigal people.  As an integral part of the first permanent European settlement, they are the site of the first contact and the earliest European agricultural and horticultural site in Australia (scientific/technical and research values);
 for its natural significance as the habitat of several animal species considered to have high local conservation value including a colony of the threatened grey-headed flying foxes (Pteropus poliocephalus).  Examples of native vegetation remain, as does the basic form of the pre-European landscape with two ridged promontories enclosing the central gully (scientific/technical and research values).

The Royal Botanic Garden Sydney is individually of exceptional value to Australia, NSW and Sydney
 as the site of the first Government Farm activities in Australia, an attempt to support the vulnerable new colony in 1788.  After the establishment of the Government Gardens -17 it remained a prime site for the trailing of important economic botanical crops including the introduction of Busby's vines in 1830;
 as part of the Vice Regal Domain and for its association with prominent individuals especially Governors Phillip, Bligh, Macquarie & Mrs Macquarie, Darling, Denison and Brisbane;
 as the earliest established botanic garden in Australia, one of the earliest established botanic gardens in the southern hemisphere and among the earliest surviving colonial botanic gardens in the world;
 for the strong and direct associations with prominent early directors such as Charles Fraser, Richard & Allan Cunningham, Charles Moore, Joseph Maiden, who were largest responsible for the overall form of the Garden's landscape, as well as the 19th century content and organisation of the plant collections;
 for its strong and direct associations with many distinguished 20th century scientists who have developed and codified knowledge and understanding of Australian plants through their researches using the Garden and Herbarium collections.  These include Joseph Maiden, William F. Blakeley, Lawrence Johnson and Barbara Briggs;
 as the study of the Garden's living and preserved collections has formed the basis of much of the contemporary knowledge and understanding of Australian plants.  This knowledge built on the extensive work by the 19th century government botanists and the plant acquisitions, whose collections are of notable early botanical explorers and collectors.  These include William Paterson, Charles Fraser, Allan & Richard Cunningham, John Carne Bidwill and Ludwig Leichhardt; and their Aboriginal assistants, whose collections are extant in both the living and the preserved collections;
 as the landscape layout, horticultural dressing as well as embellishment with statuary, fountains, memorials and structures, are indicative of the evolution of landscape styles in Australia, the landscape has evolved from a small botanic garden of a traditional functional design within the Governor's Domain or "estate park" of the Macquarie era, to the high Victorian Gardenesque which gradually replaced the "park" and which forms the framework of the existing landscape;
 as the path system, walling and layout of the Middle Garden is one of the earliest surviving garden layouts in Australia.  Although once the accepted mode for botanic gardens, especially systematic gardens – the rectangular grid layout, its importance enhanced by continuous maintenance over almost 2 centuries, is increasingly rare worldwide;
 as the design of the Lower Garden is an exceptional example of a 19th-century landscape design displaying a major engineering feature in the sea wall and network of ponds.  It exhibits Picturesque, naturalistic and Gardenesque design traits in its curvilinear pathway system with beds at junctions, the tradition of lawns for floral display now centred on the Choragic Monument (and views to Farm Cove and Government House);
 As the Garden Palace Grounds records historic layers in the remnants of the landscape design from the International Exhibition, including large scale terracing, the 1880s adaptation as a Victorian pleasure garden with associated Gardenesque layout, and early 20th century additions, particularly the Governor Phillip fountain;
 the Garden is an integral part of a wider area that contains a large group of significant colonial sites and the oldest officially established Domain in Australia (1792).  This historic area provides considerable potential to reveal much about the formative town planning, settlement and development pattern of Sydney;
 as it demonstrates the changing fashions in horticulture, garden design and ornament and the practice of horticultural botany, through its landscape, as it has continued to be developed, reshaped and embellished by successive directors and overseers (aesthetic & historic values).

The Royal Botanic Garden Sydney has aesthetic significance
 as part of the quintessential setting for one of the finest ensembles of public facilities including the Botanic Garden, Sydney Opera House, Government House, Conservatorium of Music and Sydney's scenic harbour at Farm Cove, that is outstanding in a national context and possibly internationally;
 as a largely intact designed landscape that is a place of beauty and peace in contrast to the hard edge of the surrounding city;
 as it contains buildings of refined design of the Victorian and Federation period such as the Macquarie Lodge (1848), Victoria Lodge (1863–5), the former residences of workers, overseers and directors and the 1878/1899 Anderson Building erected during the tenure of Colonial Architects Mortimer Lewis and James Barnet and Government Architect Walter Liberty Vernon.  The Garden also contains contemporary buildings of some significance representative of developments in Modern Movement architecture in Australia;
 as a source of inspiration for artists and writers since the inception of the colony and as a setting for the display of public art (aesthetic & historic values);
 as the place retains many fine components of the various phases of its layout including paths, fences, bedding areas, views, monuments, statuary, fountains, walling, steps and other landscape furnishings, these giving various compartments of the landscape distinctive visual and botanical character.

The Royal Botanic Garden Sydney have social significance
 as they are highly valued by the community and are in high demand from a broad community spectrum.  They fulfil diverse use expectations by remaining freely accessible.  The Garden as a cultural precinct provide a setting for recreation and relaxation, entertainment and events attracting over several million visitors and tourists every year;
 as from an early date developed, and continues to develop, a didactic role of increasing appreciation and conservation of plants.  It performs this important educational role through displays, public lectures, tours and special events based on the living and preserved collections and the landscape setting;
 as the Herbarium contains one of Australia's most important collections of preserved plant specimens that is highly valued by the national and international scientific community for contemporary research into systematic and horticultural botany and plant ecology.

Historical significance 
The Royal Botanic Garden and The Domain also have exceptional historical significance as:
 The second oldest botanic garden in the southern hemisphere (officially established in 1816), Rio de Janeiro being the oldest;
 The site of the first attempts at agriculture in the colony in 1788 and a rare example on a world scale where a modern nation's first attempts at feeding itself can be traced and seen;
 The site of Governor Phillip's farm within the middle garden, still evident in the way the axes of the current beds and paths follow the original furrows;
 A core remnant of Governor Phillip's original Government/Governor's Domain (1792);
 An important part of Governor Macquarie's plan for Sydney;
 The first extensive open space designated in Sydney, and representative of a small group of early 19th century public spaces in Sydney;
 A site of early public recreation since 1831, in continuous public use since;
 Evidence of remnant native vegetation remaining from the time of white settlement of the Sydney area.
 Retention of many important structures and memorials from early Colonial times when the gardens formed part of the original Governor's Domain (such as the c.1812 Macquarie wall and gateway, Mrs Macquarie's Road, fountains, statues, gates, a varied collection of buildings both public (e.g.: herbarium) and private (e.g.; Victoria Lodge gate house, Superintendent's residence/Cunningham Building, Old Herbarium/Anderson Building));
 A beautiful and varied collection of plants, statuary, fountains, monuments, and structures representative of Victorian cultural attainments and garden embellishments;
 Demonstrating a very early example of providing public access to open space or parkland (1831 cf 1850s in England);
 Their being the site of the first zoo in Australia;
 Their being the site of the 1878 International Exhibition, and Garden Palace, a major event for Sydney and the first such exhibition in Australia, featuring works of art and industry.

Associations 
The Botanic Garden and The Domain demonstrate strong or special associations with the life and works of persons, groups of persons of importance in NSW's cultural and natural history, including:
 Their association with the work and influence of key figures in the European scientific world such as Sir Joseph Banks, Sir William Hooker and Joseph Dalton Hooker at Kew Gardens, London;
 Their association with the life and works of past Domain overseers, including David Wilson, August Kloster and James Jones, many of whom made significant contributions to the development of the Domain and other public areas in Sydney designed by the Directors of the Botanic Garden and their staff;
 For their rich heritage of memorials as elements of urban design, including The Domain's Henry Kendall memorial seat, the Palace Garden Gates and wall, the Cunningham memorial island and obelisk, the monument to the forces of the Desert Mounted Corps wall, the Captain Arthur Phillip fountain monument and the sunken garden memorial to the Pioneers.

Aesthetic significance 
The Botanic Garden and The Domain have aesthetic significance for the following reasons:
 As a palimpsest of one hundred and fifty years of Colonial and Victorian garden design with some very fine late 19th century landscaping;
 For demonstrating a mixture of early 19th century garden design styles with Colonial style geometric beds in the middle garden and picturesque romantic style features such as serpentine paths and island beds in the other areas;
 Their design as a public pleasure garden, containing many enclosed scenes enhanced with decorative foliage and water forms and providing many enframed views across the harbour;
 For the public role key Directors such as Moore and Maiden played in propagating and promoting rainforest tree and palm species and good design in garden making in the planting of public streets, parks and institutional grounds around NSW;
 Their continuing educational role in demonstrating high standards of ornamental horticulture to the public;
 As an important major defining landscape and recreational asset of Sydney;
 For The Domain's role as a contributing and defining element providing continuity in the series of public parklands extending from Hyde Park to the Royal Botanic Garden, important in the open space network of the City of Sydney;
 Because of the reciprocal visual relationship between the Garden and The Domain and the historic buildings group along Macquarie Street, Hospital Road and St. Mary's Cathedral.  These buildings are part of the setting of the Garden and Domain, and the Garden and The Domain in turn form a parkland backdrop setting for these buildings, which is appreciated by their users and the public;
 For including a number of individually significant structures of high aesthetic value such as the Art Gallery of NSW, the Domain Lodge and a group of statues and memorials including the Robert Burns statue;
 For their rich tradition of gently curving walls, including the two Macquarie walls, the Farm Cove sea wall, the Woolloomooloo gates and wall, the Government House western terrace walls and the walls that originally contained The Domain.

Scientific significance 
The Botanic Garden and The Domain have scientific significance as:
 Australia's oldest scientific institution (1816);
 Continuing centre for scientific research, particularly in systematic taxonomic botany;
 Historic centre for economic botany and experimental horticulture, being a key place for exportation of Australian native plants (most active period of exporting to Europe was up until 1820), and for the importation, acclimatisation, propagation and dispersal of plants establishing many of Australia's horticultural and agricultural industries, such as the wine and olive industries and experimenting with many others (opium poppies, eucalypt oil distillation);
 Their demonstration of the extensive international colonial exchange network of botanic gardens in promoting plant exploration, discovery, taxonomy, propagation, dispersal and cultivation;
 Their association with the work and influence of key figures in the European scientific world such as Sir Joseph Banks, Sir William Hooker and Joseph Dalton Hooker at Kew Gardens, London;
 Their association with the work and influence of key figures in Australian botany such as Alan Cunningham, Charles Fraser, John Carne Bidwill, Charles Moore, Joseph Maiden;
 Their rich (c110 species) and early (1860s) collection of temperate and subtropical climate palms, considered one of the finest in the world;
 Their fine collection of trees from the South Pacific and other Pacific regions, including of the family Araucariaceae (e.g.: the genera Araucaria and Agathis) and figs (the genus Ficus).

Social significance 
The Botanic Garden and The Domain have social significance for the following reasons:
 They demonstrate a very early example of providing public access to open space or parkland (1831 cf 1850s in England);
 Their long and continuing role in providing pleasure, edification and interest to the public while at the same time representing key social values such as law, order and social status;
 Their recreational use by the community over a long period and the domain which has traditionally been the centre for political and religious discussion and meetings and continues to provide venues for large public gatherings and entertainment;
 Their being the site of the first zoo in Australia (1860 aviary);
 Their being the site of the 1878 International Exhibition, and Garden Palace, a major event for Sydney and the first such exhibition in Australia, featuring works of art and industry;
 Their continuing role in public education through lectures, demonstration plantings etc. on the value and diversity of plants, their beauty, range, uses and cultivation, and more recently on nature conservation and biodiversity issues;
 Their continuing educational role in demonstrating high standards of ornamental horticulture to the public;
 As a significant site for political and religious discussion and meetings, democratic debate and the expression of dissent, in the Domain;
 As demonstration of the importance placed upon accessible and inalienable public space in Sydney, which dates back to the 1830s;
 As a habitat to a threatened fauna species, the grey headed flying fox (bat).

Archaeological significance 
The Botanic Garden and The Domain are identified in the Archaeological Zoning Plan for Central Sydney as an Area of Archaeological Potential, with the potential to yield information that will contribute to an understanding of NSW's cultural or natural history.  It is an area potentially rich in archaeological remains, dating from Aboriginal occupation and the earliest years of the establishment of the colony.

Central Depot
The Central Depot is of historical significance for its previous use as the kitchen garden associated with Government House (1813–1870) and its ongoing historic use as a centre for plant propagation, cultivation and display serving the Royal Botanic Garden, Sydney. It contains several rare late 19th and early 20th century glasshouses, and retains evidence of their original heating systems.  The Central Depot is of research significance for its archaeological potential.

The archaeology within the Central Depot belongs to all of the identified time frames of the overall statement of archaeological significance for the Botanic Gardens.  The early remains of the first farm, and the Macquaries' landscaping of the Domain all built by convicts, are of exceptional State heritage significance.  Other archaeological evidence, glasshouses and the boiler room equipment and such, associated with the development of the Botanic Garden can contribute to the story of the Garden and has high Local archaeological significance.

The Tarpeian Way
The Tarpeian Way is of State significance for its prominence as a quarried, weathered sandstone cliff face, with stone steps and iron railing, which defines the northern boundary of the Royal Botanic Garden and the southern boundary of the Sydney Opera House. The drama, scale and simplicity of the quarried sandstone face of theTarpeian Wall plays a crucial role in supporting the entry point and setting of the Sydney Opera House, where it provides an enclosing "backstage wall" to the open forecourt space. It is considered a "crucial element in [the World Heritage] Buffer Zone . . . including its steps and upper perimeter fence. Although not legally on the Sydney Opera House site, it immediately borders and defines its southern edge and the open space of the forecourt. Because of its scale, location and configuration, it plays a crucial role in the approach and entry experience, setting, and definition, of the Sydney Opera House site."

'Its vertical quarried sandstone face, with its steps and fence, is an historic artefact in its own right and retains the only visible evidence of activities on the Sydney Opera House site predating the Opera House itself.' Its traces of anti-Vietnam War graffiti dating from the 1970s are of State significance as a remnant of an important Australian social movement in a major public space. The Tarpeian Way is of local significance for its associations with politicians and bureaucrats who authorised and undertook the cutting in 1880 including Sydney Alderman C. Moore, J. S. Farnell, then Minister for Lands, E. Bradridge, City Surveyor and Mr. Moriarty, the Engineer for Harbours and Rivers. The Tarpeian Way has an unusually dramatic, classical association through its name with the famous rock in Rome from which prisoners were hurled to their deaths in ancient times. The Tarpeian Way is of State social significance for the high regard in which it is held as a dramatic backdrop to the forecourt space of the Sydney Opera House, and as an access point between the Sydney Opera House and the Royal Botanic Garden. It is often used by members of the public enjoying its marvellous views of the Sydney Opera House and harbour setting.

The Royal Botanic Garden and The Domain were listed on the New South Wales State Heritage Register on 2 April 1999 having satisfied the following criteria.

The place is important in demonstrating the course, or pattern, of cultural or natural history in New South Wales.

The second oldest botanic garden in the southern hemisphere, the only older one being Rio de Janeiro. It contains many important structures and memorials from early Colonial times when it formed part of the Governor's Domain.

The place is important in demonstrating aesthetic characteristics and/or a high degree of creative or technical achievement in New South Wales.

Within the Royal Botanic Garden there is a beautiful and varied collection of statuary, fountains, monuments, and structures representative of Victorian cultural attainments and garden embellishments.  Magnificent garden on the site of Australia's first farm, now providing beauty and peace in contrast to the city skyline.

The place has potential to yield information that will contribute to an understanding of the cultural or natural history of New South Wales.

It contains an important botanical collection vital for education and research.

See also

Australian Botanic Garden Mount Annan
 Auburn Botanical Gardens
 Blue Mountains Botanic Garden
 Macquarie Culvert
 National Herbarium of New South Wales
 The Domain, Sydney
 Parks in Sydney
 Geography of Sydney

References

Bibliography

Attribution

External links

The Allan Cunningham Project dedicated to documenting information related to Allan Cunningham Botanist Explorer 1791–1839
  [CC-By-SA]

Botanical gardens in New South Wales
Parks in Sydney
Organisations based in Australia with royal patronage
Sydney New Year's Eve
1816 establishments in Australia
World's fair sites in Australia
New South Wales State Heritage Register
Sydney central business district
Articles incorporating text from the New South Wales State Heritage Register
Green bans
Parks established in 1816